The Arthur and Ellen Colgan House, at 407 Third Street in Edgemont, South Dakota, was listed on the National Register of Historic Places in 2017.

Photos show it is a two-and-a-half-story or three-story house.

The house has a wraparound porch and was built around 1900. Its architecture is said to reflect the then-ongoing transition between the Queen Anne and Colonial Revival styles.

The Colgans owned general merchandise stores in Oelrichs and in Edgemont.

References

Houses on the National Register of Historic Places in South Dakota
Queen Anne architecture in South Dakota
Colonial Revival architecture in South Dakota
Houses completed in 1900
Fall River County, South Dakota